Frisius is a surname. Notable people with the surname include:

Friedrich Frisius (1895–1970), German naval commander
Gemma Frisius (1508–1555), Dutch philosopher, mathematician, and cartographer
Johannes Acronius Frisius, Dutch doctor and mathematician
Simon Frisius, Dutch engraver